Dave's One Night Stand is a British comedy programme made by Amigo Television and Phil McIntyre Television for Dave. The series featured stand-up comedians performing in their hometowns. It was first broadcast for four series from 10 October 2010 until 12 December 2012.

Overview
Each episode featured a stand-up comedian taking the viewers on a tour of their hometown, they then headline a stand-up act at the local theatre with two supporting acts.

Production
For the first series each headline act performed at a different location in the United Kingdom with two supporting acts.  From the second the acts performed in the UK or Ireland.  Despite being advertised as comedians doing a stand up show in their home towns, there is the occasional episode where they do not appear in that location (Reginald D. Hunter for example, whose episode was filmed in Edinburgh).

The show was produced by ITV Studios, Amigo Television and Phil McIntyre Entertainment. The theme tune was composed by Edward Stove.

Transmissions

References

External links
Dave's One Night Stand at Dave's official website

2010s British comedy television series
2010 British television series debuts
2012 British television series endings
British stand-up comedy television series
Dave (TV channel) original programming
Television series by ITV Studios
English-language television shows